A furniture museum is a museum with exhibits relating to the history and art of furniture.  This is a list of articles about notable furniture museums. Many other types of museums also host furniture exhibits.

List of furniture museums
 Antique Furniture & Wooden Sculpture Museum in Milan
 Chinese Furniture Museum in Taoyuan
 Furniture Manufacturing Eco Museum in Tainan
 Furniture Museum in Aure
 High Wycombe Chair Making Museum in High Wycombe
 IKEA Museum in Älmhult
 Imperial Furniture Collection in Vienna
 Louis Vouland Museum in Avignon
 Wycombe Museum in High Wycombe

External links
 Met Museum on furniture

Furniture

Furniture